The Triple Crown in the sport of snooker is the achievement of winning three specific events: the UK Championship, the Masters, and the World Snooker Championship. First introduced in 1927, the World Snooker Championship reverted to being played as a knockout tournament in 1969, with all subsequent competition considered as the "modern era" of snooker. The Masters was introduced in 1975, and the UK Championship in 1977. The UK Championship was only contested between British residents and passport holders until 1984, when it became open to all professional overseas players. The Triple Crown events are generally the most prestigious on the calendar, with the three winners in the 2021–22 snooker season earning more prize money than from any of the other events.

English player Ronnie O'Sullivan has won 21 Triple Crown titles, having contested a record 29 finals. He is one of 11 players to have won each of the three events at least once, the others being Steve Davis, Terry Griffiths, Alex Higgins, Stephen Hendry, John Higgins, Mark Williams, Neil Robertson, Mark Selby, Shaun Murphy and Judd Trump. The finals held at each of the Triple Crown events are listed below.

UK Championship finals

Masters finals

World Snooker Championship finals

Players who have appeared in multiple finals

See also
List of snooker players by number of ranking titles

References

Snooker tours and series
Lists of snooker players
Snooker professional competitions
World Snooker Championships
UK Championship (snooker)
Masters (snooker)